Tom Vaughan-Lawlor (born 4 November 1977) is an Irish actor. He is best known in Ireland for his roles as Nigel 'Nidge' Delaney in the RTÉ One series Love/Hate (2010–2014), and is known internationally for his role as Ebony Maw in Avengers: Infinity War and its sequel Avengers: Endgame.

Early life
Vaughan-Lawlor was born in Dundrum, Dublin, Ireland. He attended De La Salle College, Churchtown, an all-male state secondary school in Dublin 14. He graduated from Trinity College, Dublin, with a degree in Drama Studies and continued his studies at the Royal Academy of Dramatic Art in London, England.

Career
After leaving the RADA Vaughan-Lawlor starred in many plays including The Quare Fellow directed by Kathy Burke, This Lime Tree Bower, for the Young Vic, and as Christy Mahon in The Playboy of the Western World for the Abbey Theatre which toured North America. Also at the Abbey he played Len in Edward Bond's Saved, Solyony in David Leveaux's production of Three Sisters and as Arturo Ui in Bertolt Brecht's The Resistible Rise of Arturo Ui. In 2008 he played Lyngsrand in The Lady from the Sea by Henrik Ibsen directed by Lucy Bailey. At the National Theatre London he played Yolland in Sean Holmes' production of Brian Friel's  Translations in 2005

In 2008 Vaughan-Lawlor played the Dauphin in Henry V at the Royal Exchange Manchester for which he received an Ian Charleson Award commendation. For his performance in The Resistible Rise of Arturo Ui he won the 2009 Irish Times Best Actor Theatre Award. He won the award again in 2014 for Howie the Rookie.

He also had small roles in The Tiger's Tail, which starred fellow Irish actor Brendan Gleeson and Becoming Jane which starred Anne Hathaway and James McAvoy.

From 2010 to 2014, he began playing the lead role of Nigel "Nidge" Delaney in the critically acclaimed Irish television crime drama Love/Hate. For his portrayal of Nidge he has won the Best Actor in a Supporting Role for Television award at the 2012 IFTA Awards, and the Best Actor for Television award at the 2013 IFTA Awards. On playing the role of Nidge he said "One of the joys of playing the part is he's a different man in all four series, he's always changing and he's incredibly difficult to pinpoint, people are drawn to him because of his humour, the moments he has with his children and the moments he has with his own conscience."

During  Love/Hate he continued working on stage in production such as the 2010 West End production of All My Sons directed by Howard Davies. The next year he played Jerry Devine in Davies's production of Juno and the Paycock. In 2013 Vaughan-Lawlor played both the Howie Lee and the Rookie Lee in Mark O'Rowe's Howie the Rookie. Originally written for two actors, O'Rowe re-imagined the play for one actor to play both parts, and directed the production himself for Landmark Productions. The production opened in Dublin, then toured to Cork, Galway, and the Edinburgh Festival. In 2014 the production was invited to the Barbican Centre London where it played in The Pit for 2 weeks, and then toured to BAM in New York.

In 2013 he appeared in the role of Byrne in fifth episode of the BBC2 crime drama Peaky Blinders. In October 2013, he began filming in Dublin on a three-part political drama Charlie which is based on the life of the late Taoiseach Charles Haughey. He played political spin doctor P. J. Mara in the drama.

Vaughan-Lawlor played McCabe in Jim Sheridan's movie The Secret Scripture with Rooney Mara and Jack Reynor which filmed in early 2015, and appeared in the 2016 film The Infiltrator with Bryan Cranston and Diane Kruger, directed by Brad Furman.

He appeared in the three-part drama Trial of the Century, where he played Patrick Pearse. In July 2016 Vaughan-Lawlor played Michaelis in the BBC's 3-part television adaptation of Joseph Conrad's 1907 novel The Secret Agent.

Personal life
Vaughan-Lawlor currently lives in Whitstable with his wife Claire Cox, who is an actress, and their son.

His father played the part of a priest in Love/Hate and his son Freddie, appeared as Nidge and Trish's second child John in the crime drama.

Filmography

Film

Television

References

External links

1977 births
Living people
Irish male film actors
Irish male television actors
Male actors from Dublin (city)
Alumni of Trinity College Dublin
Alumni of RADA
21st-century Irish male actors
Irish male stage actors